Serena Monique Guthrie  (born 5 January 1990) is a former netball player from Jersey who played internationally for England. She played in the Centre, Wing Attack and Wing Defence positions. She was a dynamic player, known for her speed and athleticism, with a keen eye for the intercept. She made the squad in 2008, debuting soon after when she was just 17 years old, and has so far earned over 50 caps for her country.

In domestic netball, she played for Team Bath until 2015, when she signed with the Northern Mystics in New Zealand, having previously trained with the team in 2012. In 2017 Guthrie began playing for Giants Netball in the Australian Suncorp Super Netball league. In her time at the Giants, Guthrie was a formidable player, winning the club MVP award for the 2017 season and becoming one of the league's premier mid-courters. She left the Super Netball league at the end of the 2018 season, saying she wanted to return to the United Kingdom in 2019. She will return to her old club Team Bath from 2019.
Out of netball she is a DJ. She inspires many to play. She played in the 2009 Netball World Youth Championships where she was vice captain. She won a gold medal in 2011 World Netball Series as well as a bronze medal at the 2011 Netball World Championships. She was also a part of the team that whitewashed Australia in January 2013, the first time the Diamonds had been whitewashed in a series since 2004. Guthrie was an influential contributor to England's gold medal successes at the 2017 Fast5 Netball World Series and 2018 Commonwealth Games. She was appointed captain of the team for the series against Uganda in November 2018. Guthrie was also granted the honour of captain for the Roses' 2019 Netball World Cup campaign.

Guthrie was appointed Member of the Order of the British Empire (MBE) in the 2020 New Year Honours for services to netball.

On 9 March 2022, Guthrie retired from netball after announcing her pregnancy.

References

1990 births
Living people
Jersey sportswomen
English netball players
Netball players at the 2018 Commonwealth Games
Giants Netball players
Northern Mystics players
Team Bath netball players
Commonwealth Games medallists in netball
Commonwealth Games gold medallists for England
Members of the Order of the British Empire
2019 Netball World Cup players
English expatriate netball people in New Zealand
Suncorp Super Netball players
English expatriate netball people in Australia
2011 World Netball Championships players
2015 Netball World Cup players
Medallists at the 2018 Commonwealth Games